is a Japanese actress and fashion model represented by Stardust Promotion.

Biography
Araki was recruited when she was in elementary school. Her first leading film role was Ikari o Nagero in May 2008. Araki became an exclusive model for the magazine non-no in 2014.

Her first leading television drama role was the Fuji Television drama Love Love Alien in 2016. Araki's skills are playing the euphonium and trumpet.

She voiced Gabby Gabby in the Japanese dub of Toy Story 4.

Filmography

Films

TV dramas

TV series

Stage

Advertisements

Music videos

Advertising

Internet

Magazines

Notes

References

External links

  - 
  - 

1993 births
Living people
Actresses from Tokyo
Japanese female models
Japanese film actresses
Japanese stage actresses
Japanese television actresses
Stardust Promotion artists
21st-century Japanese actresses
Models from Tokyo Metropolis